Sir George Harry Holcroft, 1st Baronet (1856 – 19 April 1951) was an English coal mine owner and philanthropist.

Holcroft was chairman of Littleton Collieries. He also served as high sheriff of Staffordshire from 1913 to 1914. Like his uncle, Sir Charles Holcroft, he was a great benefactor to the University of Birmingham, and for these services he was created a Baronet in the 1921 New Year Honours. His home was at Eaton Mascott Hall, near Shrewsbury.

Footnotes

1856 births
1951 deaths
English businesspeople
English philanthropists
People associated with the University of Birmingham
Baronets in the Baronetage of the United Kingdom
High Sheriffs of Staffordshire